Passenger safety may refer to:

Automobile safety
Aviation safety